is a railway station in the town of Shinchi, Fukushima Prefecture, Japan, operated by East Japan Railway Company (JR East).

Lines

Station layout
The station has two opposed side platforms connected to the station building by a footbridge. The station is unstaffed and Suica can be used.

Platforms

History
Komagamine Station opened on July 10, 1952. The station was absorbed into the JR East network upon the privatization of the Japanese National Railways (JNR) on April 1, 1987.

The station building escaped serious damage from the 2011 Tōhoku earthquake and tsunami on 11 March 2011, but the tracks and adjacent stations were destroyed, and services were suspended. The station  reopened on 10 December 2016.

Surrounding area

Komagamine post office
Soma Port

See also
 List of railway stations in Japan

References

External links

 

Stations of East Japan Railway Company
Railway stations in Fukushima Prefecture
Jōban Line
Railway stations in Japan opened in 1952
Shinchi, Fukushima